The Bayfield 25 is a Canadian pocket cruiser sailboat, that was designed by Ted Gozzard and first built in 1975.

Production
The boat was built by the Bayfield Boat Yard between 1975 and 1984 in Bayfield, Ontario, Canada, but it is now out of production.

Design

The design was originally known as the Bayfield 23, then later in 1975 it was advertised as the Bayfield 23/25 and in 1976 as the Bayfield 25.

The Bayfield 25 is a small recreational keelboat, built predominantly of fiberglass, with teak wood trim. It has a masthead sloop rig, a clipper bow with a bowsprit, wooden decorative trailboards on the bow, a keel-mounted rudder and a fixed long keel. Steering is by a tiller with a wheel optional. It displaces  and carries  of ballast.

Features include an anchor locker, internal halyards, a 4:1 aft mainsheet with a traveller, slab-reefing, jib tracks and two cockpit jib winches. A halyard winch was a factory option.

Accommodation consists of a "V"-berth in the bow, twin settee berths and a starboard berth that runs under the vanity and locker. An alcohol-fired stove stores under the starboard berth. The head is located on the port side and includes a  holding tank.

Originally produced with two cabin ports per side, in 1982 the manufacturer started installing three ports per side.

The boat has a PHRF racing average handicap of 261 with a high of 261 and low of 270.

Operational history
A 2014 review of the design in Sail Magazine said, "the Bayfield 25 is well known for its 1,500-pound full keel that draws less than 3 feet, shippy-looking miniature bowsprit and comfortable living spaces that provide 6 feet of standing headroom."

Owner Barb Constans said of the design, "She's a great boat. She's faster than our [Southern Cross] 31 was, and she can go out in 25 to 30 knots [of wind] with two reefs in the main; she just jogs right along. She handles waves well. We're really pleased with her."

In a review Michael McGoldrick wrote, "The Bayfield 25 fits many people's definition of a true pocket cruising sailboat. It has a miniature bowsprit and shoal draft full-keel, and it comes complete with a diesel engine and very livable interior with standing headroom. Not bad for a boat whose length is more like 24 feet, if you don't count the bowsprit. This boat does, however, have a small cockpit. Another drawback is that it takes a fair amount of wind to get these boat moving at a good clip. Many cruising sailboats sacrifice some performance in favour of comfort and livability, and these tend to be more noticeable on smaller designs. On the other hand, Bayfield sailors will be out enjoying strong winds when many other boats will be heading back to port."

In a 2010 review Steve Henkel wrote, "compared to other 23-footers, she won't win races (PHRF of 270) but she stands a chance of competing on liveaboard comfort with 5' 9" headroom ... Worst features: We don't like to see the icebox under the port side quarter berth. It's so inconvenient to reach for a cold drink on a hot day. How about a big portable ice chest, instead?"

See also

List of sailing boat types

Related development
Bayfield 30/32

Similar sailboats
Beachcomber 25
Beneteau First 25.7
Beneteau First 25S
Beneteau First 260 Spirit
Bombardier 7.6
C&C 25
C&C 25 Redline
Cal 25
Cal 2-25
Capri 25
Catalina 25
Catalina 250
Com-Pac 25
Dufour 1800
Freedom 25
Hunter 25.5
Kelt 7.6
Kirby 25
MacGregor 25
Merit 25
Mirage 25
Northern 25
O'Day 25
Outlaw 26
Sirius 26
Tanzer 25
US Yachts US 25
Watkins 25

References

External links

Keelboats
1970s sailboat type designs
Sailing yachts
Sailboat type designs by Ted Gozzard
Sailboat types built by Bayfield Boat Yard